The Martin House and Farm is a historic farm at 22 Stoney Hill Road in North Swansea, Massachusetts.  The main house is a -story gambrel-roofed wood-frame structure, with a crosswise ell at the rear.  The oldest portion was built in 1728 by John Martin, as a single pile structure with a gable roof.  It was soon afterward extended with a kitchen space, and was enlarged about 1814, when the gambrel roof was added.  The property was farmed by Martin's descendants until 1934, when the property was bequested to The National Society of the Colonial Dames of America.  The house is operated by the Dames as a historic house museum.  It was listed on the National Register of Historic Places in 1978.

See also
National Register of Historic Places listings in Bristol County, Massachusetts

References

External links
 Martin House Farm - National Society of The Colonial Dames of America

Houses completed in 1728
Farms on the National Register of Historic Places in Massachusetts
History of Bristol County, Massachusetts
Houses in Bristol County, Massachusetts
Museums in Bristol County, Massachusetts
Historic house museums in Massachusetts
Swansea, Massachusetts
National Register of Historic Places in Bristol County, Massachusetts
National Society of the Colonial Dames of America
1728 establishments in Massachusetts